Burkillia is a genus of green algae, in the family Chlorochytriaceae. The genus is monotypic; the sole species is Burkillia cornuta.

References

Chlamydomonadales
Chlamydomonadales genera
Monotypic algae genera